Christian Zajaczkowski (born 16 February 1961) is a French former professional football player and manager.

International career 
Born in France, Zajaczkowski is of Polish descent. He was a youth international for France at under-21 level.

Honours 
Rennes
 Division 2: 1982–83

References

External links 
 

1961 births
Living people
French footballers
French football managers
French people of Polish descent
Sportspeople from Clermont-Ferrand
Association football midfielders
Association football defenders
LB Châteauroux players
Stade Rennais F.C. players
Le Havre AC players
Paris Saint-Germain F.C. players
RC Lens players
SC Abbeville players
AS Montferrand Football players
Périgueux Foot players
France youth international footballers
France under-21 international footballers
Ligue 2 players
Ligue 1 players
French Division 3 (1971–1993) players
Division d'Honneur players
Footballers from Auvergne-Rhône-Alpes